Pollex lomboki is a moth of the family Erebidae first described by Michael Fibiger in 2007. It is found on Lombok in Indonesia.

References

Micronoctuini
Taxa named by Michael Fibiger
Moths described in 2007